Selma Historic District may refer to

Alabama
Riverview Historic District (Selma, Alabama)
Old Town Historic District (Selma, Alabama)

North Carolina
Downtown Selma Historic District
West Selma Historic District